Timothy Darnell Drummond (born December 24, 1964) is a retired Major League Baseball pitcher. He played during three seasons at the major league level for the Pittsburgh Pirates and Minnesota Twins. He was signed by the Pirates in the 12th round of the 1983 amateur draft. Drummond played his first professional season with their Rookie league Gulf Coast Pirates in 1983, and split his last season between the Baltimore Orioles' Double-A Hagerstown Suns and Triple-A Rochester Red Wings and the Cincinnati Reds' Triple-A Nashville Sounds in 1992.

External links

1964 births
Living people
American expatriate baseball players in Canada
Baseball players from Maryland
Gulf Coast Pirates players
Hagerstown Suns players
Macon Pirates players
Major League Baseball pitchers
Minnesota Twins players
Nashville Sounds players
People from La Plata, Maryland
Pittsburgh Pirates players
Portland Beavers players
Prince William Pirates players
Rochester Red Wings players
Tidewater Tides players
Vancouver Canadians players